The New Plymouth Heritage List contains the heritage sites and buildings from New Plymouth registered in the New Zealand Heritage List/Rārangi Kōrero (formerly the Register).

This list is maintain and updated by Heritage New Zealand (aka Heritage New Zealand Pouhere Taonga, initially the National Historic Places Trust and, from 1963 to 2014, the New Zealand Historic Places Trust).

One of New Plymouth District Council’s goals is to preserve the local cultural heritage items, such as buildings, structures and areas, archaeological and waahi tapu sites.
New Plymouth District Council has admitted that “more work needs to be done” to protect some of the city’s oldest heritage buildings.

The “Architecture Now” magazine presented an itinerary in New Plymouth including heritage buildings and stated: "The city remains the location of some of the oldest surviving architect-designed buildings in New Zealand."
One of the first settlers arriving in New Plymouth in 1843 was Frederick Thatcher, a London-trained architect. He came with the intention to become a farmer, but was drawn into design and civic administration. At the direction of  Bishop Selwyn he designed St. Mary’s Cathedral and at direction of Governor Sir George Grey designed one of four hospitals (The Gables Colonial Hospital) ambitiously intended to serve both Maori and settlers.

References

Bibliography
Heritage New Zealand,  New Zealand Heritage List

See also
 List of category 1 historic places in Auckland
 List of category 2 historic places in Auckland
 List of historic places in Wellington

Buildings and structures in New Plymouth
New Plymouth